Horringer is a village and civil parish in the West Suffolk district of Suffolk in eastern England. It lies on the A143 about two miles south-west of Bury St Edmunds. The population in 2011 was 1055.

Heritage
Horringer was earlier known as Horningsheath. The school kept this spelling until after the Second World War.

The village includes the main entrance to Ickworth house, a Neoclassical country house which was the seat of the Earls and Marquesses of Bristol until the 7th Marquess sold the lease to the National Trust.

Notable residents
In birth order:
Thomas Rogers (c. 1553–1616), a religious controversialist and cleric was the Rector of St Leonards, Horringer, from 1581 until his death.
John Covel (1638-1722), clergyman and scientist who became Master of Christ's College, Cambridge and vice-chancellor of the University
Elizabeth Cavendish, Duchess of Devonshire, born Elizabeth Christiana Hervey in Horringer on 13 May 1759, became a notable society hostess and patron of the arts. Her father, Frederick Hervey, 4th Earl of Bristol, later Bishop of Cloyne (1767–1768) and Bishop of Derry (1768–1803), believed in equality among religions.
Melmoth Hall (1811–1885), born here, became a first-class cricketer in Australia.
The remains of Victor Hervey, 6th Marquess of Bristol (1915–1985) were returned from Menton, France, by his son in 2010 for a funeral at Horringer before burial at St Mary's Church, Ickworth.

Demography
According to the Office for National Statistics, the parish of Horringer at the time of the United Kingdom Census 2001 had a population of 901 in 397 households, which rose to 1,055 at the 2011 Census. The ward population of 2,593 in the 2011 Census was estimated at 2,617 in 2019.

Population change

Location grid

References

External links

Village website

 
Villages in Suffolk
Civil parishes in Suffolk
Borough of St Edmundsbury